Bousset is a French surname. Notable people with it include:

 Wilhelm Bousset, German theologian
 Jean-Baptiste Drouart de Bousset, French composer
 René Drouart de Bousset, French composer and organist

See also
 Bossuet, surname

French-language surnames